Darshan (born 29 April 1991) is an Indian actor who appears in Tamil language films. He made his breakthrough by playing the supporting role in Kanaa (2018) and played one of the leads in Thumbaa (2019). He is also the runner up of the comedy cooking show Cooku with Comali (season 3).

Early life 
Darshan was born on 29 April 1991 in Coonoor in the state of Tamil Nadu. He later did his schooling at Stanes Higher Secondary School, Coonoor, and went to CSI Bishop Appasamy College Of Arts And Science for his college. He later graduated from his studies and decided to go into the film industry full time.

Career 
Darshan first made his lead debut under Sivakarthikeyan productions banner called Kanaa playing a supporting role known as Murali Krishna which was directed by Arunraja Kamaraj. The film overall received a high positive feedback from critics. After his debut, Darshan received an offer from director Harish Ram L. H to play the lead character in his adventure themed film Thumbaa. Darshan later agreed to the offer and was cast in the lead along with Keerthi Pandian and Dheena. In 2022, Darshan appeared as a contestant in the comedy television show called Cooku With Comali which aired on Star Vijay which also marked his television debut.

Filmography

Films

Short films

Television

References

External links 

Living people
Tamil male actors
Male actors from Tamil Nadu
21st-century Indian male actors
Male actors in Tamil cinema
1989 births